Nematabad (also Romanized as Ne‘matābād; also known as Boneh-ye ’ājjī-ye Moḩammad Taqī, Boneh-ye Hājjī, and Bunneh-i-Hājji) is a village in Khesht Rural District, Khesht District, Kazerun County, Fars Province, Iran. At the 2006 census, its population was 101, in 20 families.

References 

Populated places in Kazerun County